The 2023 season will be DPMM FC's 10th season  in the top flight of Singaporean football, the Singapore Premier League. Along with the SGPL, the club will also compete in the Singapore Cup.

Squad

Singapore Premier League squad

Coaching staff

Transfers

Pre-Season transfers

In

Out

Extension / Retained

Trial

Friendly

Pre-Season Friendly

Team statistics

Appearances and goals

Competitions

Overview

Singapore Premier League

Singapore Cup

Notes

References 

DPMM FC seasons
DPMM FC